Ficus lapathifolia is a species of plant in the family Moraceae. It is endemic to Mexico.

Location
The species is recorded to be in the remaining areas of the rainforest. The north-most area is found is in northern Veracruz. It is endemic to Mexico and found in areas of Chiapas, Oaxaca, Veracruz, Nayarit, Jalisco, and Colima.

References

Sources
 
 Eoearth.org: Encyclopedia of Earth, "Jalisco Dry Forests", by C Michael Hogan for World Wildlife Fund, Published 23 April 2014.

External links
Current IUCN Red List of All Threatened Species

lapathifolia
Endemic flora of Mexico
Trees of Veracruz
Trees of Yucatán
Taxonomy articles created by Polbot
Taxa named by Friedrich Anton Wilhelm Miquel